Jim Deegan (born 6 November 1933) is a British field hockey player. He competed at the 1964 Summer Olympics and the 1968 Summer Olympics.

References

External links
 

1933 births
Living people
British male field hockey players
Olympic field hockey players of Great Britain
Field hockey players at the 1964 Summer Olympics
Field hockey players at the 1968 Summer Olympics
Sportspeople from Edinburgh